RNL Design is a Denver-based multidisciplinary design firm offering services in architecture, interior design, planning and urban design, landscape architecture, lighting design, and facilities master planning.

History 
Founded in 1956, a one-man operation in Denver known as John B. Rogers, Architect.  Rogers, the "R" in RNL Design, studied architectural engineering at Kansas State University.  His studies were interrupted by three years of service in the U.S. Army during World War II, after which he returned to graduate.  Rogers came to Denver in 1947 to work for the architectural firm Smith, Hegner and Moore.  After working in Denver, he attended the University of Texas, earning a bachelor of architecture degree in 1951, and an MBA from the University of Colorado in 1984.

Rogers joined forces with Jerome Nagel in 1961 to form Rogers Nagel Architects.

In 1966, Rogers Nagel Architects joined with Victor Langhart to form Rogers Nagel Langhart Architects and Engineers.

In 2000, acquired Klages Carter Vail and Partners, an architectural firm located in Orange County, California.

Notable Projects
 The National Renewable Energy Laboratory's Research Support Facilities on the U.S. Department of Energy's campus in Golden, CO with Smith group
 Shams Abu Dhabi Master Plan
 1800 Larimer
 Glendale Community College North Expansion
 The Spire
 1755 Blake Street
 Colorado Supreme Court Complex
 Colorado History Museum
 Rocky Mountain News Building
 The Cable Center at the University of Denver
 Burj Khalifa Master Plan
 Vail Tower
 Commerce City Civic Center
 Wellington Webb Municipal Office Building

References

 RNL named among top five sustainable design firms in the U.S.
 RNL's design for NREL Building will be among world's greenest
 RNL wins four awards at IIDA Southwest Chapter 2009 Pride Awards
 RNL's concepts for CU School of Architecture and Planning
 Tania Salgado of RNL wins 2009 National AIA Young Architect of the Year award
 Office environments influence health and well-being
 Tania Salgado of RNL named one of the Top 40 under 40
 Global Design Firm Celebrates 50th Year
 RNL named one of the Top 20 Architecture Firms to Work For
 83-year old founder and designer of Denver landmarks still active as firm transitions to next 50 years

Companies based in Denver
Architecture firms based in Colorado